Plainsman Park, officially Samford Stadium – Hitchcock Field at Plainsman Park, is the college baseball venue for the Auburn University Tigers. As of 2015, its seating capacity is 4,096. In 2003, Baseball America rated the facility the best college baseball venue in the country. The home team bullpen is located behind the left field fence, forcing media in the press box to use monitors to determine who is warming up.

Plainsman Park was first used as a baseball facility in 1950.  In 1996, Auburn significantly renovated Plainsman Park, drawing inspiration from ballparks such as Camden Yards, Fenway Park, and Wrigley Field in their design for the park.  The architect was Cooke Douglass Farr Lemons. In 1997, it was renamed Hitchcock Field at Plainsman Park in honor of brothers Jimmy and Billy Hitchcock.  In 2003, the facility was renamed Samford Stadium – Hitchcock Field at Plainsman Park in honor of longtime trustee Jimmy Samford.

In 2013, the Tigers ranked 25th among Division I baseball programs in attendance, averaging 2,657 per home game.

See also
 List of NCAA Division I baseball venues

References

External links
Plainsman Park at AuburnTigers.com

Auburn Tigers baseball
College baseball venues in the United States
Baseball venues in Alabama
Buildings and structures in Auburn, Alabama
Auburn Tigers sports venues
1950 establishments in Alabama
Sports venues completed in 1950